Trofeo Ciudad de Sevilla was a summer friendly tournament, being held in the city of Seville, organized by the Municipality of that city, in collaboration with the two football clubs more representative of Seville - Sevilla FC and Real Betis. In the beginning there used to be three participating teams, but in the last years it has been a two-team tournament. The first edition was in 1972 and was won by Sevilla FC. In 1994 he played his sixteenth and final edition.

Trofeo Ciudad de Sevilla held at Estadio Ramón Sánchez Pizjuán owned by Sevilla FC and Estadio Benito Villamarín owned by Real Betis, celebrating the end of the tournament in a different stadium each edition.

In 1992, after seven years without organizing the tournament, and on the occasion of the Universal Exposition in Seville, played a special edition, which they took part Sevilla FC, Real Betis, FC Barcelona, Atlético Madrid, Vasco da Gama and FC Porto, which won the tournament.

The trophy presented represents the most emblematic buildings and monuments of the city of Seville, La Giralda and the Torre del Oro. The trophy was different in each edition held.

Titles
Note that only the winner and runner-up is shown here. Some years there were more than two participating teams.

Notes and references

Real Betis
Sevilla FC
Sevilla, Ciudad